This is a list of processors that implement the MIPS instruction set architecture, sorted by year, process size, frequency, die area, and so on. These processors are designed by Imagination Technologies, MIPS Technologies, and others. It displays an overview of the MIPS processors with performance and functionality versus capabilities for the more recent MIPS Aptiv families.

MIPS Computer Systems/MIPS Technologies

Imagination Technologies
MIPS Technologies was acquired 17 December 2012, by Imagination Technologies. Since then, the following processors have been introduced by Imagination Technologies.

Imagination Technologies sold MIPS processor rights to Tallwood MIPS Inc in 2017. MIPS Technologies was acquired by Wave Computing in 2018, where "MIPS operates as an IP licensing business unit".

The Warrior P-Class CPU was announced on 14 October 2013.

The CPU IP cores comprising the MIPS Series5 ‘Warrior’ family are based on MIPS32 release 5 and MIPS64 release 6, and will come in three classes of performance and features:
 'Warrior M-class': entry-level MIPS cores for embedded and microcontroller applications, a progression from the popular microAptiv family
 'Warrior I-class': mid-range, feature-rich MIPS CPUs following on from the highly efficient interAptiv family. The I6400, with its 64-bit core, was launched September 2014.
 'Warrior P-class': high-performance MIPS processors building on the proAptiv family

Other designers
A number of companies licensed the MIPS architecture and developed their own processors.

Other
 PhysX P1 - A multi-core physics processing unit that contains MIPS cores

References

MIPS
MIPS architecture